Andrew George William Parsons (born 10 February 1977) is a Brazilian sports administrator and journalist. He is the current president of the International Paralympic Committee (IPC).
In 2018, Parsons became a member of the International Olympic Committee (IOC).

Biography
Parsons was born in Brazil to Scottish parents.  He served as chairperson of the Brazilian Paralympic Committee from 2009 to 2017, chairperson of the Americas Paralympic Committee from 2005 to 2009, and as a member of the Nominating Committee for the 2020 Summer Olympic Games.

He is the current president of the International Paralympic Committee since 8 September 2017. Parsons took over from Sir Philip Craven, who had been in office since 2001, after being elected in the first round in the election held during the 18th assembly of IPC in Abu Dhabi.

Parsons himself does not have a disability, a fact that, he says, takes some observers by surprise.

While attending the opening ceremony for the 2022 Winter Paralympics, Parsons declared his horror at the Russian invasion of Ukraine and called on world authorities to promote peace. While addressing the spectators and athletes in attendance at Beijing, China's Bird Nest, Parsons stated that “Tonight, I want, I must begin with a message of peace” and that "As the leader of an organization with inclusion at its core, where diversity is celebrated and differences embraced, I am horrified at what is taking place in the world right now.”

Distinctions
  Commander of the Order of Rio Branco
 Diploma of Fair Play, awarded by the International Fair Play Committee during the 2004 Summer Paralympics.

References

1977 births
Living people
Brazilian journalists
International Olympic Committee members
Presidents of the International Paralympic Committee
International Paralympic Committee members
Brazilian people of Scottish descent